Eric Wan Tin-chiu (born 28 October 1964) is a Hong Kong television actor best known for his role as "Fong Tin-yau" in the My Date with a Vampire television series trilogy produced by the Hong Kong television network ATV. Wan began his acting career after graduating from the ATV Training Course in 1983. He started as a host in television programmes for children before entering the drama department. He has since acted in many films and television series, including Century of the Dragon, Horoscope One: Voices from Hell, Ransom Express, 2 Reincarnated 2, Fist of Fury, and DNA.

Filmography

Feature films
Century Hero (Bruce Lee Bio) (1999)
Horoscope One: Voices from Hell (1999)
House of the Dammed (1999)
Century of the Dragon (1999)
Ransom Express (2000)
Ghost Promise (2000)
Sharp Guns (2001)
Yao Wu Yang Wei – Fantasy of Hero (2002)
Shanghai Knights (30s cameo) (2003)
My Honeymoon with a Vampire (2003)
The Peeper Story 2 – The Escape Partner (2003)
The Prince of Storm (2003)
The Reporter (2003)
Mission X (2004)
Missing Link (unknown year)
Faces (unknown year)
Run for Life (unknown year)

Telemovies
My Death Project (unknown year)
Hong Kong Criminal Archives – Gang AK47 (1992)

Television
Empress Wu (1984)
Bitter Conflict (1984)
Ten Brothers (1985)
The Legendary Prime Minister – Zhuge Liang (1985)
Sensational Cases of the Late Qing Period (1986)
Heroes of Shaolin (1986)
Buddha Jin 2 (1986)
Xi Shih (1986)
The Duel (1987)
The Merry Young Boxer (1987)
The Rise and Fall of Qing Dynasty (1987)
The Rise and Fall of Qing Dynasty 2 (1988)
Court Secret Agent (1988)
Wordless Kung Fu Scripture (1989)
Thunder Knight (1989)
City of Swordsman  (1989)
The Blood Sword (1990)
The God of Sword (1990)
Legend of Long Quan Ling (1991)
The Solitary Swordsman (1991)
Police Story (1992)
Mythical Crane Magical Needle (1992)
Gamblers Dream (1993)
Shanghai Godfather (1993)
2 Reincarnated 2  (1993)
The Legend of Yue Fei (1994)
Fist of Fury (1995)
I have a Date with Spring (1995)
Vampire Expert 2 (1996)
Who is the Killer (1996)
The Swordsman (1996)
Coincidentally (1997)
97 The Year of Chameleon (1997)
My Date with a Vampire (1998)
A Lawyer can be Good (1998)
The Lost Prince (1999)
DNA (2001)
My Date with a Vampire 2 (2001)
Lady Stealer (2002)
Thunder Cops (2003)
My Date with a Vampire 3 (2004)

External links
Eric Wan fansite

1964 births
Hong Kong male actors
Living people